William S McDonald or MacDonald (1885-date of death unknown), was a Canadian international lawn bowls player who competed in the 1934 British Empire Games.

Bowls career
At the 1934 British Empire Games he won the silver medal in the singles event.

Personal life
He was a druggist by trade and travelled to the 1934 Games with his wife Margaret.

References

Canadian male bowls players
Bowls players at the 1934 British Empire Games
Commonwealth Games silver medallists for Canada
Commonwealth Games medallists in lawn bowls
1885 births
Year of death missing
Medallists at the 1934 British Empire Games